César Injoque (born 1913, date of death unknown) was a Peruvian sports shooter. He competed in the 50 m pistol event at the 1948 Summer Olympics.

References

External links

1913 births
Year of death missing
Peruvian male sport shooters
Olympic shooters of Peru
Shooters at the 1948 Summer Olympics
Place of birth missing
Pan American Games medalists in shooting
Pan American Games bronze medalists for Peru
Shooters at the 1951 Pan American Games
Medalists at the 1951 Pan American Games
20th-century Peruvian people